Rodrigo Alonso Martín (born 4 January 2003), commonly known as Rodri, is a Spanish footballer who plays as a midfielder for Albacete Balompié, on loan from Villarreal CF.

Club career
Born in Castellón de la Plana, Valencian Community, Rodri joined Villarreal CF's youth setup in 2010, from hometown side CD Castellón. He made his senior debut with the C-team on 5 September 2021, starting in a 1–0 Tercera División RFEF away win over Callosa Deportiva CF.

On 11 December 2021, Rodri renewed his contract with the Yellow Submarine until 2025. He first appeared with the reserves the following 9 January, starting in a 2–1 Primera División RFEF away loss against Algeciras CF.

Rodri made his professional on 3 September 2022, coming on as a half-time substitute for Carlo Adriano in the B-side's 3–0 home win over CD Mirandés in the Segunda División. The following 27 January, he was loaned to fellow second tier side Albacete Balompié for the remainder of the season.

References

External links

2003 births
Living people
Sportspeople from Castellón de la Plana
Spanish footballers
Footballers from the Valencian Community
Association football midfielders
Segunda División players
Primera Federación players
Tercera Federación players
Villarreal CF C players
Villarreal CF B players
Albacete Balompié players
Spain youth international footballers